St Lucia is a riverside suburb in the City of Brisbane, Queensland, Australia. In the  St Lucia had a population of 12,574 people. The University of Queensland is the main attraction of St Lucia, with the university, and residential colleges covering a large proportion of the suburb. St Lucia is home to a diverse range of people and families. Typically, the student population of St Lucia is high, especially in dwellings in the immediate vicinity of the university, but the suburb is also home to wealthy professionals and families.

Geography 
The suburb sits on a peninsula, bounded on the north, east and south by the median in a bend of the Brisbane River. The eastern third of the suburb is occupied by the main campus of the University of Queensland. The flatter area on the northern side is primarily medium to high density residential including some high-rise apartments on the river-front. The more hilly area in the centre and south is mainly low-density, family-occupied residential. The south-west is occupied by the St Lucia Golf Course.

Ironside is a neighbourhood within the suburb.

The Elbow is the name for the easternmost part of the suburb, where the Brisbane River makes a sharp bend.

There are two reaches of the Brisbane River surrounding the suburb:

 St Lucia Reach, to the north of the suburb

 Cemetery Reach, to the east of the suburb, with the name referring to the South Brisbane Cemetery on the opposite side of the river in the suburb of Dutton Park

Six Mile Rocks are rocks in Brisbane River to the south of the suburb.

Three creeks flow through the suburb:

 Toowong Creek, which enters the river in the north-west of the suburb
Carmody Creek, through the University of Queensland campus entering the river in the east of the suburb
 Sandy Creek, flows easterly from Robertson Park, through the St Lucia Golf Course to enter the river in the south-west of the suburb

History

The area was originally part of Indooroopilly and later part of Toowong. Originally known as Indooroopilly Pocket, for a short time it was called Toowong South and part of the area was hived off as Lang Farm.

Sugar plantations were established in the area in the 1860s. William Alexander Wilson, born in St Lucia in the West Indies, purchased the Coldridge Plantation in 1882 and renamed it St Lucia Sugar Plantation. It was subdivided in 1883 for housing and the name was transferred to the subdivision.

Toowong Mixed State School opened on 10 October 1870. It was renamed Indooroopilly State School in 1879 and then Indooroopilly Pocket State School in 1888. It was renamed Ironside State School in October 1904 after the neighbouring estate of John Dunmore Lang.

The median age of the St Lucia population was 23 years, 15 years below the Australian median. Children aged under 15 years made up 8.6% of the population and people aged 65 years and over made up 8.3% of the population. The most notable difference was in the group aged between 15 and 24 years; in St Lucia this group comprises 47.2% of the population, compared to 12.8% nationally. 46.2% of people living in St Lucia were born in Australia, compared to the national average of 66.7%; the next most common countries of birth were China (9.9%), Malaysia (5.9%), Singapore (3.6%), England (2.6%), and Indonesia (2.5%). 55.1% of people spoke only English at home; the next most popular languages were Mandarin Chinese (14.0%), Malay (3.4%), Indonesian and Cantonese (2.4% each), and Vietnamese (2.1%). The most common response for religion in St Lucia was No Religion (39.7%), followed by Catholicism (14.8)%, "Not stated" (10.4%), Anglicanism (8.6%), and Islam (7.1%). In St Lucia, just over half of all households (50.1%) were family households, 21.7% were single person households and 28.3% were group households. The median weekly household income was $1,385, similar to the national median of $1,438.

Heritage listings 

St Lucia has a number of heritage-listed sites, including:
 12 Upland Road: Great Court, University of Queensland
 38 Upland Road: Union College
 99 Sir Fred Schonnel Drive: Vida and Jayne Lahey's House
 378 Swann Road: Ironside State School
 396 Swann Road: Langer House

Although never heritage-listed, one of St Lucia's most iconic homes was the so-called The Pink Palace at 272 Swann Rd until it was demolished in 2016.

Education 

Ironside State School is a government primary (Prep-6) school for boys and girls at 2 Hawken Drive. In 2017, the school had an enrolment of 1,486 students with 73 teachers (66 full-time equivalent) and 32 non-teaching staff (20 full-time equivalent).

There are several high schools close to St Lucia, although there is no secondary school in St Lucia. The nearest secondary schools are Indooroopilly State High School, St Peters Lutheran college, Brisbane Boys College and the Queensland Academy of Science, Mathematics and Technology (QAMST).

Amenities 
Several small shopping precincts are located throughout the suburb but otherwise the suburb is residential. With the main precinct being a strip of stores that runs along Hawken Drive, This particular strip is home to the local IGA Supermarket, many international restaurants, a medical centre, dentist office and a post office/news-agency. With Friday nights being the most popular time for these restaurants as many of the residents like to eat out. St Lucia Golf Links is an 18-hole pay-and-play public golf course located on the corner of Indooroopilly Road and Carawa Street. The golf course is one of Brisbane's oldest and has hosted several Queensland Open and PGA tournaments. The layout suits golfers of all levels.

The University gives public access to their swimming pools, tennis courts and other amenities, although a fee will be charged when using some of these facilities. The Schonell Theatre host many performances that members of the public can buy tickets to go and see.

Events 
Every Saturday morning at 7AM the free St Lucia 5 km parkrun takes place near the University of Queensland opposite the UQ Aquatics Centre on Sir William Macgregor Drive.

Transport

By Bus, St Lucia can be accessed from the western suburbs and Brisbane CBD, with routes terminating at the University of Queensland. There is also a NightLink service, a safety initiative which provides buses with security on board all night Fridays and Saturdays. The Eleanor Schonell Bridge, a dedicated bus/pedestrian/bicycle bridge, connects the University with Dutton Park and carries buses from the southern suburbs, CBD and Royal Brisbane Hospital to the Lakes Bus Station on St Lucia campus.

By Ferry, The CityCat stops at two terminals in St Lucia, the Guyatt Park CityCat Terminal and University of Queensland Terminal.

By Bicycle, St Lucia has bicycle routes that utilise the residential streets between the University of Queensland and Toowong.

By Road, St Lucia has three major thoroughfares which all lead to the University of Queensland. These are Swann Road, Sir Fred Schonell Drive and The Esplanade.

References

External links

 University of Queensland: Queensland Places: St Lucia

 
Suburbs of the City of Brisbane